The Igarapé Natal is a river of Acre state in western Brazil.

See also
List of rivers of Acre

References
Brazilian Ministry of Transport

Rivers of Acre (state)